Amira Gad is an Egyptian art curator, writer, and editor in modern and contemporary art and architecture who was born in France but grew up in Saudi Arabia. She is currently Head of Programmes at the Light Art Space (LAS), a private foundation based in Berlin.

Career
From 2009 to 2014, Gad was Managing Curator and Publications at Witte de With Center for Contemporary Art in Rotterdam. In her time at the institution, she curated exhibitions and public programmes including the show ‘Short Big Drama’ with artist Angela Bulloch (co-curated with Nicolaus Schafhausen in 2012), ‘The Temptation of AA Bronson’ (2014) that received the AICA Best Exhibition of the Year Award in The Netherlands and the 2-day conference I AM FOR AN ART CRITICISM THAT… held at Witte de With Center for Center for Contemporary Art and Stedelijk Museum Amsterdam curated with the-then artistic director Defne Ayas.

Gad worked as a curator at the Serpentine Galleries in London from 2014 to 2019 where her exhibitions were widely covered by the international press. She curated exhibitions of work (and edited the accompanying publications) by artists Arthur Jafa (2017-on tour) and Jimmie Durham (2015). Her show of Lynette Yiadom-Boakye's work ‘Verses After Dusk’ awarded the artist the Sky Arts Award for Visual Arts in 2016.

Her exhibition of Arthur Jafa's work ‘A Series of Utterly Improbable, Yet Extraordinary Renditions’ (co-curated with Hans Ulrich Obrist) won the AICA Award for Best Exhibition of 2018 in Germany. The exhibition continued its tour to Galerie Rudolfinum in Prague and the Moderna Museet in Stockholm (2019). The accompanying catalogue (co-edited with Joseph Constable) won the Richard Schlagman Art Book Award in 2019.

Sondra Perry's 2018 Serpentine Galleries exhibition ‘Typhoon Coming On’ traveled to the Institute of Contemporary Art in Miami while the Torbjørn Rødland exhibition ‘The Touch That Made You’ she curated in 2017 toured to the Fondazione Prada Osservatorio in Milan.

Alongside working on exhibitions of modern and contemporary art, Gad was the curator working on the public commission by Lee Ufan installed in Kensington Gardens in 2018[16], as well as part of the selection committee that appointed Japanese architect Junya Ishigami for the 2019 Serpentine Pavilion and the curator on Serpentine 2016 architecture programme that presented Bjarke Ingels Group (BIG), Asif Khan, Kunlé Adeyemi (NLE), Yona Friedman, and Barkow Leibinger.

Selected exhibitions
 Albert Oehlen (2019)
 Hito Steyerl: Power Plants (2019) (curated with Ben Vickers, Kay Watson, and Amal Khalaf)
 Sondra Perry: Typhoon Coming On (2018)
 Abdulnasser Gharem and Heimo Zobernig: Subversive Forms of Social Sculpture (2018)
 Torbjørn Rødland: The Touch That Made You (2017)
 Arthur Jafa: A Series of Utterly Improbable, Yet Extraordinary Things (co-curated with Hans Ulrich Obrist), 2017-ongoing
 John Latham: A World View, 2017
 Zaha Hadid: Early Paintings and Drawings (co-curated with Hans Ulrich Obrist), 2016
 Helen Marten: Drunk Brown House, 2016
 Angela Bulloch and Maria Zerres: Considering Dynamics and the Forms of Chaos, 2016
 HACK SPACE (co-curated with Hans Ulrich Obrist), 2016
 Simon Denny: Products for Organising, 2015
 Jimmie Durham: Various Items and Complaints, 2015
 Lynette Yiadom-Boakye: Verses After Dusk, 2015
 Julio Le Parc: Drawings and Games, 2014
 Reiner Ruthenbeck, 2014
 Blue Times (co-curated with Nicolaus Schafhausen), 2014
 The Temptation of AA Bronson (curated by AA Bronson, organised together with Defne Ayas), 2013
 Angela Bulloch: Short Big Drama (co-curated with Nicolaus Schafhausen), 2012

Other activities
Gad is a regular guest lecturer at Sotheby's Institute of Art in London and other art schools in addition to giving talks, leading masterclasses and workshops such as Frieze Academy's day-long event ‘How to Curate an Exhibition’.

Bibliography
Lee Ufan: The Art of Encounter (editor, Serpentine Galleries, Koenig Books and Lisson Gallery, 2019)
Sondra Perry: Typhoon Coming On (editor, Serpentine Galleries and Koenig Books, 2018)
Torbjørn Rødland: The Touch That Made You (editor, Serpentine Galleries and Koenig Books, 2018)
Arthur Jafa: A Series of Utterly Impossible, Yet Extraordinary Renditions (editor, Serpentine Galleries and Koenig Books, 2018)
John Latham: A World View  (editor and writer, Serpentine Galleries and Koenig Books, 2017)
Zaha Hadid: Early Paintings and Drawings (editor, Serpentine Galleries and Koenig Books, 2016)
HACK SPACE (editor, Serpentine Galleries and K11 Art Foundation, 2016)
Helen Marten: Drunk Brown House (editor, Serpentine Galleries and Koenig Books, 2016)
Angela Bulloch & Maria Zerres: Considering Dynamics and the Forms of Chaos (editor, Sternberg Press & Sharjah Art Museum, 2016)
Serpentine Pavilion and Summer Houses (editor, Serpentine Galleries and Koenig Books, 2016)
Simon Denny: Products for Organising (editor and writer, Serpentine Galleries and Koenig Books, 2015)
Jimmie Durham: Various Items and Complaints (editor, Serpentine Galleries and Koenig Books, 2015)
Lynette Yiadom-Boakye: Verses After Dusk (editor and writer, Serpentine Galleries and Koenig Books, 2015)
Willem de Rooij, Character is Fate: Piet Mondrian’s Horoscopes (editor, Witte de With Publishers, 2015)
The Crime Was Almost Perfect (editor, Sternberg Press and Witte de With Publishers, 2014)
Erik van Lieshout, HOME: Rotterdam Zuid (editor, Witte de With Publishers, 2014)
Morality in Fragments (editor, Witte de With Publishers, 2014)
Lidwien van de Ven: Rotterdam – Sensitive Times (editor, Witte de With Publishers, 2013)
Angela Bulloch: Source Book 10 (editor, Witte de With Publishers, 2012)
Tariq Ramadan: On Super-Diversity (Copy-Editor, Witte de WIth Publishers and Sternberg Press, 2012)
Miki Kratsman: All about us (assistant editor, Sternberg Press and Ursula Blickle Foundation, 2011)

Awards and honours
Nomination for Women Leading the Art World, UK (The Sunday Times)
Winner of the 2019 Richard Schlagman Art Book Award in the category Outstanding Artist's Book
Winner of the AICA Award 2018: Exhibition of the Year, Germany
Winner of the Sky Arts Awards 2016: Visual Arts Category, UK
Winner of the Best Dutch Book Design 2015, The Netherlands
Winner of the AICA Awards 2014: Exhibition of the Year, The Netherlands

References

German art curators
German women curators
Saudi Arabian women curators
Art writers
Living people
Year of birth missing (living people)
Saudi Arabian historians
Women historians
Egyptian historians
German women historians
Egyptian women curators
German women editors
Saudi Arabian women editors
Egyptian women editors